The 1965 Cleveland Indians season was a season in American baseball. The team finished fifth in the American League with a record of 87–75, 15 games behind the Minnesota Twins. The Indians played .500 ball for the first 40 games, then eventually heated up going on a 10-game winning streak at one point improving their record to 37-24. They would peak at 46-28, but would cool off significantly after the All-Star break (going 41-47 the rest of the way) and would only spend six days in first place. Still, the Indians 87-75 record would be the best win–loss record they would post between 1959 and 1994. This season also marked the return of Rocky Colavito. This led to an increase in attendance (a season after the Indians almost left Cleveland, due to low attendance). The trade itself ended up being a disaster in the long run, even though it was successful short term (for one season). The Indians were the only team to win the regular season series vs the AL pennant winning Twins (who would lose to the Dodgers in 7 games in the 1965 World Series).

Offseason 
 October 21, 1964: Ralph Terry was sent to the Indians by the New York Yankees to partially complete an earlier deal made on September 5 (the Yankees sent players to be named later and $75,000 to the Indians for Pedro Ramos). The deal was completed on November 27, when the Indians received Bud Daley from the Yankees.
 December 1, 1964: Woodie Held and Bob Chance were traded by the Indians to the Washington Senators for Chuck Hinton.
 January 20, 1965: Tommie Agee, Tommy John and Johnny Romano were traded by the Indians to the Chicago White Sox as part of a 3-team trade. The White Sox sent Cam Carreon to the Indians, and Jim Landis, Mike Hershberger and a player to be named later to the Kansas City Athletics. The Athletics sent Rocky Colavito to the Indians. The White Sox completed the deal by sending Fred Talbot to the Athletics on February 10, 1965.
 January 30, 1965: Oscar Zamora was signed as an amateur free agent by the Indians.

Regular season

Season standings

Record vs. opponents

Notable transactions 
 May 3, 1965: Joe Rudi was selected off waivers by the Indians from the Kansas City Athletics as a first-year waiver pick.
 June 8, 1965: Ray Fosse was drafted by the Indians in the 1st round (7th pick) of the 1965 Major League Baseball Draft.
 June 15, 1965: The Indians traded a player to be named later and cash to the California Angels for Phil Roof. The Indians completed the deal by sending Bubba Morton to the Angels on September 15.

Opening Day Lineup

Roster

Player stats

Batting

Starters by position 
Note: Pos = Position; G = Games played; AB = At bats; H = Hits; Avg. = Batting average; HR = Home runs; RBI = Runs batted in

Other batters 
Note: G = Games played; AB = At bats; H = Hits; Avg. = Batting average; HR = Home runs; RBI = Runs batted in

Pitching

Starting pitchers 
Note: G = Games pitched; IP = Innings pitched; W = Wins; L = Losses; ERA = Earned run average; SO = Strikeouts

Other pitchers 
Note: G = Games pitched; IP = Innings pitched; W = Wins; L = Losses; ERA = Earned run average; SO = Strikeouts

Relief pitchers 
Note: G = Games pitched; W = Wins; L = Losses; SV = Saves; ERA = Earned run average; SO = Strikeouts

Farm system

References

External links 
1965 Cleveland Indians season at Baseball Reference

Cleveland Guardians seasons
Cleveland Indians season
Cleveland